St Matthew's Church is a Church of England church in the London Borough of Lambeth. It is a Grade II* listed building which occupies a prominent position at the junction of Brixton Road, Brixton Hill and Effra Road. The church was constructed following the Church Building Act 1818 and was consecrated in 1824.

Parish 
These arrangements were inconvenient for those living in the new housing that was already starting to appear along the main roads passing through Brixton, a situation that was addressed by the construction of four new churches at Waterloo, Kennington, Norwood and St Matthew's at Brixton. The St Matthew's parish created in 1824 included Brixton, Brixton Hill, Herne Hill, Tulse Hill and (in modern terms) the Loughborough Junction and western Camberwell area.

In 1886 the population of the parish amounted to 13,924 and was served by three clergy. The total proportion attending (morning and evening services) was 12.4%.

In 1901 the population of the parish was 12,029. In the following year, there were two clergymen and the total proportion attending was 11.2%.

In 2002 St Matthew's parish was united with that of St Jude's in East Brixton, whose church building had been sold in 1980 and which had no incumbent since 1991. St Jude's was built in 1867–68.

Based on statistics from the UK census, the Diocese of Southwark estimates the population of the parish was 12,100 in 2001 and 15,500 in 2011. It is not clear whether the figure for 2001 includes people who were then living in the former parish of St Jude's.

Building 

The church was constructed following the Church Building Act 1818, which allowed for new churches in overpopulated parishes. Land was taken from Rush Common for the church. Initial works began late in 1821 and the foundation stone was laid by Charles Manners-Sutton, Archbishop of Canterbury on 1 July 1822. The church was consecrated in 1824.

Since 19 October 1951 St Matthew's church has been designated a Grade II* listed building. It was designed by Charles Ferdinand Porden (1790-1863) with the foundation stone laid in 1822 and the church consecrated two years later. The building is a rectangle, with a massive Greek Doric entrance portico at the west end, fronting onto Brixton Hill. A tower stands at the east end of the building.

During the 1970s and subsequently, major internal alterations have been carried out to provide accommodation for a variety of activities, including continued use of a part by the Anglican congregation.

The building and its churchyard occupies a highly visible triangular site at the junction of major roads, but pedestrian access is somewhat restricted because of the width of these roads and the density of the traffic.

Architecture
The church is built of pale yellowish brick with dressings of stone and Roman cement. The west portico is tetrastyle in antis and has fluted Doric columns. There are three tall doors which are battered and which have enriched panels, in eared moulded architraves. By the doors are cast iron boot-scrapers.

The church has five-bay sides with pilasters of Roman cement and entablature. The church lies on a stone plinth and has battered windows with eared architraves. On each side there are stairs with side-walls down to an entrance to the crypt. There is a pedimented doorway enclosed by a strong, double wrought iron gate.

The east end of the church is stone-faced with a wide projecting central tower bay, which has a window. There are doors in recessed side bays. The tower has a square bell stage with Doric screens, below on octagonal "Tower of the Winds" which has a low conical top with a crown and cross. At the base of the Tower of the Winds is a blue-faced clock with gilt numbering.

When the building was given Listed Building status in 1951, it was reported that inside the church there was a wide gallery around three sides and in the west end a Doric organ case. In front of the east window was a tall screen of two Doric columns. There were also original pews and some memorial tablets. The more recent internal changes to the building have provided a smaller worship area at the west end of the building with access through a lobby from the main entrance doors. The worship area has ancillary accommodation such as a vestry and kitchen. There is also a gallery (although not the one mentioned in the 1951 listing description).

Notable people

Former British Prime Minister John Major married Norma Major in the church in 1970.

Notes

External links 

 Diocese of Southwark - Statistics for St Matthew with St Jude Brixton
'Brixton: Rush Common' Survey of London: Volume 26: Lambeth: Southern area (1956), pp. 131–136.

Brixton
Brixton
Grade II* listed buildings in the London Borough of Lambeth
Churches completed in 1824
19th-century Church of England church buildings
Brixton
Brixton